Silverburn is a small hamlet near Penicuik, in Midlothian, south-east Scotland. It has a small community centre, with a garden surrounding the hall, which featured on the BBC Television programme The Beechgrove Garden in June 2008. It has a small population of just over 60 and is about 8 miles south of Edinburgh.

External links

 Geograph - NT2060 - Silverburn

Villages in Midlothian